Ivanildo Soares Cassamá (born 9 January 1986 in Bissau), known simply as Ivanildo, is a Guinea-Bissauan former professional footballer who played as a winger.

Honours
Porto
Primeira Liga: 2005–06
Taça de Portugal: 2005–06

References

External links

1986 births
Living people
Bissau-Guinean emigrants to Portugal
Sportspeople from Bissau
Bissau-Guinean footballers
Portuguese footballers
Association football wingers
Primeira Liga players
Liga Portugal 2 players
Segunda Divisão players
FC Porto B players
FC Porto players
U.D. Leiria players
Associação Académica de Coimbra – O.A.F. players
Gil Vicente F.C. players
Portimonense S.C. players
S.C. Olhanense players
Portugal youth international footballers
Portugal under-21 international footballers
Portugal B international footballers
Guinea-Bissau international footballers